Phages is a 2006 EP by The Most Serene Republic. The artwork depicts downtown Toronto's Yonge and College intersection looking north from the southwest corner in the winter.

Phages has been described as a "transitional record that points the way towards 2007's even more opulent Population, Phages is an important point in The Most Serene Republic catalog on its own merits".

Track listing
"Emergency Performance Art Piece" - 2:40
"You're Not an Astronaut" - 4:15
"Phages" - 5:03
"Shopping Cart People" - 2:45
"Jazz Ordinaire" - 4:29
"Threehead" - 5:09
"Anhoi Polloi" - 4:46
"Stay Ups" - 3:57

Personnel
Adrian Jewitt - vocals
Ryan Lenssen - piano, vocals
Nick Greaves - guitar
Andrew McArthur - bass
Emma Ditchburn - guitar, vocals
Adam Nimmo - drums
Sean Woolven - guitar, backing vocal

References

The Most Serene Republic albums
2005 EPs
Arts & Crafts Productions EPs